Mammoth is a town in Pinal County, Arizona, United States. The population was 1,426 at the 2010 census; according to 2018 Census Bureau estimates, the population of the town is 1,650.

History

Mammoth was founded c. 1872 as Mammoth Camp, serving the nearby Mammoth Mine. Until 2003, when it closed, Mammoth served as a bedroom community for the nearby San Manuel mine.

The nearby ghost town of Copper Creek is a popular local attraction.

Minerals from the old Mammoth-St. Anthony Mine are found in all major mineral collections. Tiger, Arizona was the townsite at the Tiger mine, but nothing remains of this ghost town.

In November 2014 Mammoth was the subject of a fictional horror tale on the Reddit subreddit "/r/nosleep", which had a contagious disease wipe out the population.  Naive users believed and spread the story, somewhat akin to the 1938 War of the Worlds panic.  The town was inundated with phone calls from people trying to ascertain what was happening.

Geography

Climate
According to the Köppen Climate Classification system, Mammoth has a semi-arid climate, abbreviated "BSk" on climate maps.

Demographics

At the 2000 census there were 1,762 people, 562 households, and 440 families in the town. The racial makeup of the town was 61.9% White, 0.1% Black or African American, 1.5% Native American, 0.3% Asian, 0.2% Pacific Islander, 31.9% from other races, and 4.0% from two or more races. 73.0% of the population were Hispanic or Latino of any race.
Of the 562 households 39.0% had children under the age of 18 living with them, 55.0% were married couples living together, 16.0% had a female householder with no husband present, and 21.7% were non-families. 18.5% of households were one person and 9.8% were one person aged 65 or older. The average household size was 3.14 and the average family size was 3.54.

The age distribution was 33.5% under the age of 18, 8.9% from 18 to 24, 25.8% from 25 to 44, 20.1% from 45 to 64, and 11.6% 65 or older. The median age was 32 years. For every 100 females, there were 97.8 males. For every 100 females age 18 and over, there were 95.3 males.

The median household income was $29,861 and the median family income  was $32,661. Males had a median income of $32,768 versus $19,028 for females. The per capita income for the town was $9,878. About 23.8% of families and 28.1% of the population were below the poverty line, including 39.4% of those under age 18 and 10.6% of those age 65 or over.

Notable person
Eulalia "Sister" Bourne, pioneer Arizona schoolteacher and author (Woman in Levi's, etc.), lived much of her life in the vicinity, at her homestead in Peppersauce Canyon near San Manuel, and later at her ranch on Copper Creek near Mammoth, where she died in 1984.

References

External links
 Town Of Mammoth website

Towns in Pinal County, Arizona
Mining communities in Arizona